German submarine U-794 was a Type XVIIA U-boat of Nazi Germany's Kriegsmarine during the Second World War. She was one of a small number of U-boats fitted with Hellmuth Walter's high test peroxide propulsion system, which offered a combination of air-independent propulsion and high submerged speeds. She spent the war as a trials vessel and was scuttled on 5 May 1945 in Gelting Bay.

U-794 was built by Friedrich Krupp Germaniawerft, Kiel. The keel was laid down on 1 February 1943, the boat was launched on 7 October. She was commissioned  on 14 November. The Feldpost Number was M 52 496.

U-794 did not undertake any combat patrols and was instead assigned as a trials boat at first to the 5th U-boat Flotilla, followed by the 8th U-boat Flotilla, before returning to the 5th flotilla for the rest of the war. In late March 1944, Admiral Karl Dönitz and four other admirals took part in a trial of U-794. Although they were enthusiastic, the boat, designed for high underwater speed (over 20 m.p.h.) was difficult to manoeuvre, and the keel to beam ratio was too high.

References

Bibliography

"U-Boat Operations of the Second World War: Vol. 2: Career histories, U511-UIT25" by Kenneth Wynn, Naval Institute Press, Annapolis, 1998.

External links

German Type XVII submarines
1943 ships
U-boats commissioned in 1943
World War II submarines of Germany
World War II shipwrecks in the North Sea
Ships built in Kiel
Operation Regenbogen (U-boat)
Maritime incidents in May 1945